Michael Thomas Stanton (born September 25, 1952) is a former professional baseball pitcher.

Stanton was drafted on three occasions, by the Atlanta Braves, Kansas City Royals, and Texas Rangers before signing with the Houston Astros in 1973. He pitched briefly for the Astros in 1975, then bounced around the minors for the next four years, including a stint in the ill-fated Inter-American League in 1979. He resurfaced in the majors with the Cleveland Indians in 1980, and this time he was there for good, pitching an additional 270 games (all but one in relief) for the Indians and the Seattle Mariners before finishing up with the Chicago White Sox in 1985.

References

External links

Venezuelan Professional Baseball League

1952 births
Baseball players from Missouri
Cardenales de Lara players
Cedar Rapids Astros players
Charleston Charlies players
Chicago White Sox players
Cleveland Indians players
Columbus Astros players
Covington Astros players
Houston Astros players
Iowa Oaks players
Leones del Caracas players
American expatriate baseball players in Venezuela
Living people
Major League Baseball pitchers
Memphis Blues players
Miami Dade Sharks baseball players
Petroleros de Zulia players
Seattle Mariners players
Syracuse Chiefs players
Tacoma Tugs players